Lastman is a French comics series written by Bastien Vivès and Balak and drawn by Bastien Vivès and Michaël Sanlaville. It has been published since March 2013 by Casterman in the collection KSTЯ. In 2016, an adult animation telling the genesis of the main character, started being aired on the public French TV channel France 4.

Synopsis 
In the "Valley of Kings", a world where magic is acknowledged as reality, an annual grand tournament sponsored by the King and Queen is being prepared. Young Adrian Velba works all year in the combat school of Master Jansen to participate. Sadly, Adrian's partner suddenly falls ill and deserts. Since it is a duo tournament, the young boy is forced to give up his dream... until Richard Aldana, a hunk with bearish manners comes out of nowhere to unexpectedly ally himself with Adrian.

Characters

Main Characters 

Richard Aldana
Brash, headstrong, and hot tempered man but with a good heart, extremely resourceful, and never yielding attitude with great boxing skills.

The anime is based 10 years before the comics start. Where he meets Siri and his boxing mentor, fighting demons which are long dead original royalty from a magical parallel world called "The Valley of Kings". They are betrayed by his boxing mentors brother in containing the final demon and he ends up losing the orphan Siri who was like an adopted daughter. Unbeknownst to him he is forever tied to the broken gate the mentor's brother forced open to reach "The Valley of Kings".

In the first comic series, years later he travels to "The Valley of Kings" as Aldana uses his smarts and skill to assist Adrian and his mother Marianne, in the tournaments. This sets off on an adventure, where the three travel through the next neighboring cities of Niliopolis and Paxtown. The three grow close and decide to live happily together in "The Valley of Kings". However, they are betrayed by the captain of the guards, Jansen. Aldana becomes further despondent and aloof from 10 years of imprisonment while blamed for the death of his loved ones and ever increasing monster incursions in "The Valley of Kings".

Then starts the second series of comics. The kingdom has now reinstated the long defunct royal guard, a massive wall is built to block the entrance of the rift, and Richard Aldana is blamed for the gloom that has over taken the kingdom. The king desperately wants to end the monster incursions and hires the exiled dark wizard to assist. It turns out the wizard was the husband of Marianne, who left him because of his selfishness in dark magic, and the boxing mentor's brother. He manipulates the king and reverses the worlds logic where the living is dead and dead to life to bring back the prince's mother. Aldana is freed to join a resistance in finding the alive prince Adrian but he too is despondent and doesn't want to return. Aldana is blamed for his brashness and the resistance team once again tries to find a way to fix "The Valley of Kings" confronting the wizard in a dying world. He travels to the other world and fights even when he knows he can't win against the wizard. He therefore, knowing the magic knight can read memories forces her to read his memories to snap her out of the brainwashing. Knight realizes how much Aldana has lost and struggled while continuing to fight to help others breaking the brainwashing control with the inspiration to fight. The knight knows Aldana's memories of Siri, his mentor, his best friend, and the love of his life and that it was the wizard who has caused their loss and the damaged portal introducing the monster incursions. Aldana dies from the wizard's surprise attack and his friends along with the knight and Siri, who turns out to live years of enslavement and assassin training when transported to "The Valley of Kings", work together to defeat the wizard and restore balance. On earth years later, his friends are seen in their yearly celebration of Aldana's influence on their lives though he was rash and hard man to understand he was always caring person hand outreached. Last panel shows Aldana revived by the last dying person in "The Valley of Kings" watching the sun rise.

Adrian Velba
Marianne Velba

Characters of "the Valley of Kings" 
Master Jansen
Cristo Canyon
Lord Ignacio Cudna
King Virgil
Queen Efira
Francis Sullivan
Elorna Morgan
Gregorio Lempkin
Madame Sakova

"Paxtown" characters 
Tomie Katana
Milo Zotis
"H"
Peter Verkaik
Banus
Fiona Merry

Presentation 

The series was initially pre-published on delitoon.com, a free website for the publication of comic books on the web. In adapting Lastman to Delitoon, each panel was split up to follow the traditional webtoon type of manhwa, where instead of clicking to advance to the next page, the reader scrolls down to keep reading. None of Lastman'''s spin-off titles have yet to appear on Delitoon. Some visual differences appear between the physical and Delitoon releases of the series, notably the entirety of the eighth volume being entirely in colour on Delitoon, whereas in the physical release, only the first few pages are, with the remainder being in black and white.Lastman is depicted as a "French-style manga", by Bastien Vivès: "We use the format and some codes of the manga but we’re not playing at imitating Japanese culture". Vivès also mentions other influences such as Disney movies and blockbusters from the 80's and 90's (some of them by Steven Spielberg). Most of the characters in Lastman are named after busty pornographic actresses, notably Rachel Aldana, and Tomie Katana having both her name and likeness based on Hitomi Tanaka.

To keep up with the exacting publication rhythm of 20 sheets per week, the authors have well-defined tasks: "Bastien [Vivès] imagines the story in its main arcs, the intentions of the characters, the way the action will evolve, then talks about with the other two: Balak is in charge of the storyboard, cuts the album into episodes, in the way of a TV series season […] Finally, Michaël [Sanlaville] draws 20 sheets weekly with Bastien, and everyone checks everyone else’s sheet". The narration rhythm is based on that of a TV series’: "We try to adapt to the rhythm of quickly fast produced and aired TV series, like The Walking Dead or Game of Thrones’s adaptations. And as for this, we really have to bow down to Balak, who rapidly creates and storyboards without losing anything of his quality".

The main line of comics concluded with its twelfth volume, released on the 20th of November, 2019. As of May 2020, First Second Books has only published the first six volumes of the series in English.

 Volumes List 
 Tome 1, March 2013
 Tome 2, June 2013
 Tome 3, November 2013
 Tome 4, March 2014
 Tome 5, June 2014
 Tome 6, October 2014
 Tome 7, August 2015
 Tome 8, January 2016
 Tome 9, October 2016
 Tome 10, August 2017
 Tome 11, November 2018
 Tome 12, November 2019

 Spin-offs and special issues 
 Sexy Sirène, March 2014 is an in-universe magazine. The character Adrian Velba can be seen holding it in volume 3.
 Lastman Stories - Soir de match, January 2018 ("Match night" or "Game night", as in a game of football) is a spin-off published in January 2018, taking place between the events of the first season of the animated series and volume 1.

 Reception 

The series has received mixed review from both generalist and specialised press. Du9, who considers that the series is a success from a formal point of view, especially thanks to the "charm of Vivès’s typical feminine characters, whose beauty is sometimes only shown by a few strokes of the pencil", also thinks that it "would be less likely that the series trigger the massive adhesion of children and pre-teen readers", the authors addressing "rather young adults or, more likely, geeks nostalgic of Japanese series and/or being receptive to "fan service"". Télérama finds "the story efficient and funny, clearly inspired by Dragon Ball of Akira Toriyama". The Huffington Post points out that "Vivès uses the classical codes of martial arts tournament manga only to crush them more efficiently with his bearish and ruthless Aldana".

The series has met with quite a success in Europe with nearly 100 000 volumes sold. 10 000 copies were distributed in USA in March 2015.

 Adaptations and other media 

 Adult animation (series) 

An adult animated prequel to the comic book was produced thanks to a successful crowdfunding campaign in the summer of 2016. The episodes were all aired on France 4, on Tuesday evenings from November 22 to December 14, 2016.

The show was made available for streaming on Netflix in France and Belgium in 2018, and also on the Mondo Media VRV channel in the United States.

In June 2019, Vivès and Sanlaville confirmed that the animated series would be getting a second season.

 Video game 
A video game, Lastfight, developed by the independent publisher Piranaking, came out on September 20, 2016. It was also released for the Nintendo Switch on November 30, 2019.

 Spin-off volumes 

In March 2020, Vivès revealed in an interview with BFMTV that he was working on a second Lastman Stories volume.

 Exhibition 
 Lastman : universe at the Angoulême International Comics Festival in 2016.

 Distinction 

 Nominations 
 2014 : Finalist of the Prix BD Fnac [8]
 2014 : 41st Angoulême International Comics Festival, official selection (tome 1)

 Prizes and awards 
 2015 : Angoulême International Comics Festival Prize for a Series at the 42nd Angoulême Festival

 Work consulted 
 Lastman (animated TV series)

 Notes and references 

 External links 
 Official website  of the publisher
 Lastman [archive]'' on Delitoon.com
 Adult animation website

2013 comics debuts
French comics titles
Comics adapted into animated series
Comics adapted into television series